Hélène Fournier, (born Hélène Pellault; 23 December 1904 in Cussay – 29 March 1994) was a French resistance member, in Indre-et-Loire. She played an active role in smuggling across the demarcation line which separated the occupied zone from Vichy France, from the beginning of the summer of 1940 to 1 March 1943. She was deported to Auschwitz on 24 January 1943 in the convoy of 31,000, of which she was the only survivor. She was awarded the Legion of Honor in March 1966.

Resistance 
During the Second World War she joined the Libé-Nord resistance network. The grocery store that she runs serves as a place for the transmission of messages circulating in the network. It accommodates and helps people who are illegal, on the run or wanted for their activity in the Resistance.

The convoy of 31,000 
She was arrested on 29 October 1942. She was taken to the prison of Tours. She stayed there until 7 November 1942, along with twenty others. They were then taken to the German camp at Romainville, in Seine-Saint-Denis in the commune of Lilas. She is detained there with Elisabeth Le Port. The prisoners were transferred to the Royallieu camp, then were deported to the Auschwitz camp in the so-called the "convoy of 31,0000" of 24 January 1943, which included 230 women and 1,530 men.

She is detained in Birkenau. Rachel Deniau, Mary Gabb, who died the day of her arrival in Birkenau, Germaine Jaunay and Élisabeth Le Port among others accompanied her. Élisabeth Le Port describes her as not sharing in her correspondence. As she tries to comfort Germaine Jaunay, the latter replies "Why go back, to be beaten? ". As for Rachel Deniau, her name appears on the stele in memory of the deportees in Amboise, and a street bears her name in La Croix-en-Touraine. After her arrival in Birkenau, she contracts typhus and works in the commandos. In May 1942, she remained the only Frenchwoman in the Birkenau commandos, the others being detained in Raïsko, an annex camp located nearby, where they died. She succeeded in being admitted to the revier, the German name of the barracks intended for sick prisoners in the camps, as a cleaner thanks to Marie-Claude Vaillant-Couturier. On 2 August 1944, she was transferred to the Ravensbrück camp, then to the Mauthausen camp on 2 March 1945.

She returned to Tours on 1 May 1945. She was the only survivor of the twenty Tourangelles deported, and took on the responsibility of announcing to the families the death and the conditions of detention of their loved ones 18 at the Birkenau camp.

She obtained the rank of Corporal of the R.I.F.

References 

French Resistance members
1904 births

1994 deaths

Auschwitz concentration camp survivors
Recipients of the Legion of Honour